Bearracuda is a series of dance parties catering to the bear community. According to The Advocate, Bearracuda "is the largest attended bear dance party and most prolific gay dance event in the U.S.", with events in 40 cities globally. The series began in San Francisco in August 2006.

Locations
Dance events have been held in the following cities:

 Atlanta, Georgia
 Austin, Texas
 Birmingham, Alabama
 Chicago, Illinois
 Denver, Colorado
 Las Vegas, Nevada 
 London
 New Orleans, Louisiana
 New York City
 Portland, Oregon
 San Francisco
 Seattle
 Sydney

Reception
The San Francisco Bay Guardian called Bearracuda the "Best Club for Queer Men" in 2008, 2009, 2010, and 2011.

References

2006 establishments in California
Bear (gay culture)
Gay events